Maroondah Hospital established in 1976, is a public hospital located in the Melbourne suburb of Ringwood East, Victoria, Australia. Affiliated with Deakin University the hospital provides clinical rotations for students enrolled in years 3 and 4 of the medical student programs, focusing on children's health. 

The hospital provides secondary acute care, and acute adult mental health services along with an emergency department which is open 24 hours, 7 days a week.

Services include emergency medicine, general and specialist medicine, general and specialist surgery, critical care services, ambulatory and allied health services. 

The hospital is a major provider of specialist adult mental health services and provides community adult mental health services throughout Melbourne’s outer-east.

History 
Maroondah Hospital has played an integral part in the healthcare of local residents in Melbourne’s east since it was opened by Victorian Governor Sir Henry Winneke on July 3, 1976.

The idea for a public hospital in the region came about at a public meeting at Ringwood Town Hall in April 1964, with building commencing February 1973.

Since then, Maroondah Hospital has continued to grow.

Maroondah hospital celebrated its 40th anniversary on Wednesday 16 November 2016 with a special event.

In 2022, the hospital was in the middle of a Victorian election battle between the Labor and Liberal parties, both parties promising to provide substantial funding for redevelopments and expansion works. As part of the Labor proposal the hospital would be renamed form the Indigenous Australian name Maroondah Hospital to Queen Elizabeth II Hospital, this has been widely criticised by the Victoria’s First Peoples’ Assembly.

Services 
Maroondah hospital provides the following services:

 Aged care assessment
 Anaesthesiology – pain medicine
 Community health care
 Dietetics
 Drug and/or alcohol information/referral
 Emergency medical
 Geriatric medicine
 Hospital services
 Library
 Mental health information/referral
 Neurology
 Nursing
 Occupational Therapy
 Paediatric medicine
 Pathology – general
 Pharmacy
 Physiotherapy
 Reproductive endocrinology and infertility
 Speech pathology/therapy

See also 
 List of hospitals in Australia
 Healthcare in Australia

References

External links 
 Official website
 Victorian Department of Health

Hospitals in Melbourne
Teaching hospitals in Australia
Hospitals established in 1976
1976 establishments in Australia
Buildings and structures in the City of Maroondah